The N. Q. and Virginia M. Thompson House is a historic residence in Citronelle, Alabama, United States.  The two-story Classical Revival style house was designed by George Tyrell.  It was completed in 1905.  Due to its architectural significance, it was added to the National Register of Historic Places on January 25, 1990.

References

Houses on the National Register of Historic Places in Alabama
National Register of Historic Places in Mobile County, Alabama
Houses in Mobile County, Alabama
Neoclassical architecture in Alabama
Houses completed in 1905
1905 establishments in Alabama